Laura L. Letinsky (born 1962) is an artist and a professor in the Department of Visual Arts at the University of Chicago.[1] She is currently based in Chicago, Illinois where she lives and works. Letinsky’s works contend with what and how a photograph “means” while engaging and challenging the notions of domesticity, gender, and consumption. She was included in the 2019 PHotoEspaña and is a Guggenheim fellow.

Education
Letinsky was born in Winnipeg and received her BFA from the University of Manitoba in 1986 and MFA from Yale School of Art in 1991. She was awarded the Guggenheim Fellowship in 2000 and the Anonymous Was a Woman fellowship in 2001. She is currently a professor of visual arts at the University of Chicago.

Work

Early work 
In the 1990s, Letinsky largely photographed couples, which can be seen in her photographic series Venus Inferred. This work examined the legacy of religious pictorial traditions as they transitioned through the Enlightenment into secular imagery, specifically, that of romance and romantic love. The ontology of photographs as they relate to production and consumption became an increasing concern. Walker Evans is cited as an influence because of his interest in the vernacular, as are the artists, Garry Winogrand and Diane Arbus.  

Stifled by the conundrum of the romance narrative with its inevitable failure, especially as it was relayed through the photograph, another kind of failure in that its promise would never be fulfilled, Letinsky transitioned to photographing still lifes. Following the tradition of Dutch-Flemish still life paintings of the Northern European Renaissance, Letinksy found room for exploration in “its association with the feminine, its characterization as ‘less important,’ its affiliations with domesticity and intimacy.” She realized still lifes could “explore the tension between the small and minute and larger social structures.” Referencing Jan Groover and Giorgio Morandi, this work interrogates the question of meaning as it relates to what is described in the image as compared to how it is described. That is, what the picture is about is not necessarily laminated onto what is being pictured.  In the process of creating still life images, Letinsky developed a unique aesthetic recognized across her works.

In 2004, The Renaissance Society exhibited the long-term series she had been working on since 1997, Hardly More Than Ever, cementing her significance as a critically engaging contemporary artist.

2010s 
Letinsky stopped photographing for a year in 2009, opting to work in ceramics, textiles, and words. This turn to more material practice was related to her questions related to the photograph as image and as object. Returning to photography in 2010, she began work on another still-life series, Ill Form and Void Full. In this work, she sought to try to “restructure the desire [photography] engenders” by making overt that pictures beget other pictures, i.e. images inform subsequent images.

In 2019, Letinsky debuted her series, To Want For Nothing, in Chicago. These images marked a transition away from her domestic table settings and instead, using magazine and advertisement cutouts she creates composite images that explore form as it impacts narrative, and the unrelenting and overwhelming behemoth that is our image culture.

Solo exhibitions
 "Guild Hall, revisited", Document Gallery, Chicago, IL, 2020
 "To Want For Nothing" exhibition at Yancey Richardson in New York, 2019
 "Time’s Assignation", Musee des Beaux Arts, LeLocle, Switzerland, 2019
 Laura Letinsky and Sharon Core, Photo Espanà, Madrid, 2019
 Laura Letinsky, American Center, University of Shanghai Science & Technology, Shanghai, 2018
 Laura Letinsky, Singapore International Photography Festival, Singapore, 2018
 "Infinite Gamers", Open House Contemporary, Chicago, IL, 2017
 "Time’s Assignation", Yancey Richardson Gallery, NYC; Document, Chicago, IL, 2017
 "Telephone Game", Document Projects, Chicago, IL, 2017
 "Telephone Game", Material Exchange Fair, Mexico City; Basel, Basel Design Fair; and  Art Expo Chicago, 2017
 "57 Breaths", Skyline Design, NeoCon Fair, Chicago, IL, 2017
 "Betwixt and between", Tracey Morgan Gallery, Asheville, NC, 2017
 Still Life Photographs 1997–2012, School of Art Gallery, University of Manitoba, 2016
 "A Still Dialogue", Tanya Marcuse & Laura Letinsky, S. New Hampshire University, NH, 2016
 "Repository: Porcelain Urns", Castani Gallery, Art Expo, Chicago, IL, 2015
 Focus, Mumbai Photography Festival, Mumbai, India & A Moment on the Lips: Illinois State Museum Gallery, Normal, IL, 2015
 "STAIN": Collaboration with John Paul Morabito, Artware Editions, NYC, 2015
 "STAIN": Collaboration with John Paul Morabito, Kavi Gupta Editions & The Renaissance Society, Chicago, IL, 2015
 "Neither Necessary nor Natural", Focus, Mumbai Photography Festival, Mumbai, India, 2015 
 "Yours, more pretty", Yancey Richardson Gallery, NYC, 2014 
 "Creases Turn Sour", Carroll and Sons Gallery, Boston, 2014
 "Ill Form and Void Full", The Photographers Gallery, London, UK, 2013
 "Ill Form and Void Full", Museum of Contemporary Art, Chicago, 2012
 "Hot and Cold All Over", Joseph Carroll and Sons, Boston, 2012
 "Ill Form and Void Full", Yancey Richardson Gallery, NY; Valerie Carberry Gallery, Chicago, Museum of Hagen, Germany, 2012
 Laura Letinsky: Still Life, Denver Museum of Art, CO, 2012
 "That What Matters", Museum of North Dakota, 2011
 "After All", Stephen Bulger Gallery, Toronto, 2011
 "Fall, Brancolini Grimaldi, Florence, Italy, 2011
 "The Dog and The Wolf", Monique Meloche Gallery, 2010
 "After All", Yancey Richardson Gallery, New York, 2010
 "Still", Galerie m Bochum, Germany, 2010
 "To Peach", Donald Young Gallery, Chicago, IL, 2010
 "To Want for Nothing", Brancolini Grimaldi Galerie, Rome, Italy, 2009
 "Likeness", James Hyman Gallery, London, England, 2009
 "Before the colors deepened and grew small", galerie mBochum, Bochum, Germany, 2008
 "Dirty Pretty Things", Brancolini Grimaldi Galerie, Rome, Italy, 2007
 "To Say It Isn’t So", Yancey Richardson Gallery, NY, 2007
 "To Say It Isn’t So", Monique Meloche Gallery, Chicago, 2007
 "Somewhere, Somewhere", Stephen Bulger Gallery, Toronto, Ontario, 2007
 "Hardly More Than Ever", M. Sturm Gallery, Stuttgart, 2006 
 "Hardly More Than Ever", Joseph Bellows Gallery, La Jolla, CA, 2006
 "Somewhere, Somewhere", J. Harris Gallery, Seattle, WA, 2006 
 "Somewhere, Somewhere", Oakville Galleries, Toronto, Ontario; Bright Design Showroom, Chicago, IL, 2006
 "Hardly More Than Ever", Galerie Kusseneers, Antwerp, Belgium, 2005
 "Somewhere, Somewhere", Monique Meloche Gallery, Chicago, IL, 2005
 "Hardly More Than Ever" at the Renaissance Society, 2004
 Aftermath: Still-life photographs by Laura Letinsky, Cleveland Museum of Art, 2004
 I did not remember I had forgotten, Edwynn Houk Gallery, New York, NY; Shine Gallery, London, England; Monique Meloche Gallery, Chicago, IL, 2003
 Morning, and Melancholia, Iowa University Gallery, Iowa, 2003
 Morning, and Melancholia, Edwynn Houk Gallery, NY; Jane Jackson, Atlanta; Copia: American Academy of Food and Wine, Napa Valley, 2002 
 Venus Inferred-Self Portraits, Stephen Bulger Gallery, Toronto, 2002	
 Some Things I Know, Gahlberg Gallery, College of DuPage, IL, 2002
 Laura Letinsky, Vox Gallery, Montreal, QUE, 2001
 Morning, and Melancholia, Carol Ehlers Gallery, Chicago, IL, 2000
 Venus Inferred, Bishop's University, Quebec, 1999
 Venus Inferred, Canadian Museum of Contemporary Photography (touring), Ottawa, ONT; Guy McIntyre Gallery, New York, NY, 1998
 Coupling, Museum of Contemporary Photography, Chicago, IL, 1997

Collections
Her work is included in the collection of the Getty Museum, the Winnipeg Art Gallery, the Museum of Contemporary Art, Chicago and the Art Institute of Chicago.

References

External links
Official site
http://www.nytimes.com/2012/10/10/arts/design/laura-letinskys-food-photography.html?_r=0
https://web.archive.org/web/20131121034229/http://www.wipnyc.org/blog/laura-letinsky
http://www.artinamericamagazine.com/reviews/laura-letinsky/

1962 births
Living people
Canadian photographers
21st-century Canadian women artists
Canadian women photographers
20th-century Canadian photographers
21st-century Canadian photographers
20th-century women photographers
21st-century women photographers
20th-century Canadian women artists